Koundou  is a town and sub-prefecture in the Guéckédou Prefecture in the Nzérékoré Region of south-western Guinea, near the border of Sierra Leone.

Schools 
 Collège Fabely de Koundou
 Lycée de Koundou

References

Sub-prefectures of the Nzérékoré Region